Nsambya is a hill in the center of Kampala, the capital and largest city in Uganda. The name also refers to the upscale and middle-class neighborhoods that have been developed on the hill and its slopes.

Location
The coordinates of Nsambya Hill are 0°17'57.0"N, 32°35'17.0"E (Latitude:0.299167; Latitude:32.588056).

Overview
Nsambya Hill is one of the seven original hills on which the city of Kampala was built. The seven original hills are: Nsambya, Kibuli, Nakasero, Mengo, Old Kampala, Namirembe and Lubaga.

Nsambya was occupied by the Mill Hill Fathers, led by Bishop Henry Hanlon, starting in 1895. The infrastructure that they set up on the hill includes a Catholic Mission, a Catholic Church, a Mission Hospital, separate elementary and secondary schools for boys and girls, among others.

Points of interest
The points of interest on Nsambya Hill include St. Francis Hospital Nsambya, a 540-bed tertiary referral and teaching non-profit hospital. owned by the Roman Catholic Archdiocese of Kampala and administered by the Little Sisters of St. Francis.

Nsambya Home Care (NHC) is one of the departments of Nsambya Hospital. "The department offers medical and psychosocial support to people living with HIV/AIDS (PLWHAs)".

Other notable points of interest include (a) Radio Sapientia Uganda 94.4FM (b) Saint Peter's Cathedral Nsambya, a place of worship affiliated with the Catholic Church (c) Mother Kevin Postgraduate Medical School of Uganda Martyrs University, located at Nsambya Hospital (d) the American Embassy to Uganda and  Cavendish University Uganda, whose campus is located along Ggaba Road, opposite the American Embassy.

Notable people
 Shafiq Kagimu, footballer
 Hassan Wasswa, footballer
 Josephine Nambooze, physician, was born and grew up in Nsambya.

See also
Kabalagala
Kibuli
Nsambya Home Care
List of hospitals in Uganda
List of medical schools in Uganda
Teresa Kearney

References

External links
 St. Peter's Secondary School Homepage
Embassy of the USA Kampala Uganda

Neighborhoods of Kampala
Makindye Division